The Bodeo Model 1889  was an Italian revolver named after the head of the Italian firearm commission, Carlo Bodeo. It was produced by a wide variety of manufacturers between 1889 and 1931 in both Spain and Italy. The Bodeo was employed by the Royal Italian Army in World War I, the Interwar Italian colonial wars, and World War II. The Bodeo was manufactured in three distinct varieties, the Tipo A for Enlisted soldiers, the Tipo B for Officers, and the Modello Allegrito, which was introduced in the 1920's for commercial and police use.

History
Made by a large variety of Italian gun-makers, the Bodeo became the service revolver of the Italian Army in 1891. The revolver was named after the head of the Italian commission that recommended its adoption, Carlo Bodeo. It remained the principle handgun of the Italian Army until it was increasingly supplanted by the Glisenti Model 1910. The revolver was never declared obsolete and remained as a reserve weapon until the end of World War II. The Italian manufacturers identified with the production of the Bodeo include: Societa Siderurgica Glisenti, Castelli of Brescia, Metallurgica Bresciana, and Vincenzo Bernardelli of Gardone Val Trompia.  During World War I, Spanish manufacturers Errasti and Arrostegui of Eibar produced the Bodeo for the Italian government. The Italians nicknamed this revolver coscia d’agnello ("leg of lamb"). During World War II, the Wehrmacht designated the Bodeo as Revolver 680(i) when utilized as an alternative firearm.

Design details
The Bodeo Model 1889 is a solid-framed, six-shot revolver.  The barrel, the cylinder, the trigger components, the loading gate, the ejection rod, the springs and the screws were made in steel; while the frame, the backplate, and the ejection rod collar were made of iron. An external hammer block drop safety was designed and retrofitted to many revolvers in 1894, though this external hammer block safety was replaced with an internal safety during an arsenal refinishing program in 1915.

Prior to the First World War, the infantry version of the Bodeo was originally produced "in the white". The Italians underwent a program to arsenal refinish many revolvers in 1915, with changes including bluing the revolvers and installation of an internal hammer block drop safety. Later models of the Bodeo were blued from the factory.

Variations

The Bodeo revolver was issued in 3 primary variations:

Tipo A Enlisted Model

The Type A Enlisted model has an 4.5" octagonal barrel with a distinctive iconic folding trigger. This variation was first produced by the Royal Arms Factory at Brescia from 1889-1891, then by Glisenti at Brescia from 1891-1906. Early production Bodeo revolvers were produced in the white (i.e., unfinished), and will have an external hammer block safety. 

Production was paused until the Italo-Turkish war in 1911, when production was resumed by Toschi e Castelli. Upon entering WWI in 1915, the Italians contracted with many private producers to produce Bodeo revolvers, including Toschi e Castelli, Mida Gia a Castelli, and Mida Brescia. The Italians also contracted several Spanish firms from Eibar to produce Bodeo Tipo A revolvers during WW1. Later Italo-Turkish War and WWI variants of the Tipo A revolver will have an internal hammer block safety. Many early produciton Bodeo revolvers from the pre-war production were arsenal reblued and retrofitted with the internal hammer safety in 1915 in preparation for Italy's entrance to WW1.  

Production of Tipo A revolvers continued after WW1 until the late 1920s for a total production of approximately 300,000. All Italian manufactured Tipo A revolvers have a year of manufacture stamped on the left side of the frame, while some Eibar-contracted revolvers lack this year marking.

Tipo B Officer's Model

The Type B Officer's model has an 4.5" octagonal barrel, with a trigger guard. This variation was first produced by the Royal Arms Factory at Brescia from 1891-1893, where only ~9000 copies were made. Production was continued by Glisenti at Brescia from 1891-1906, where another 10,000 copies were made. These Brescia and Glisenti-Brescia made Tipo B revolvers are distinctive of having a slow rust blued finish and finely checkered grips. These Tipo B revolvers will also have the  Crest of Savoy on the left-hand side of the frame. 

Importantly, there was no serial production of Tipo B Officer's model revolvers after 1906. An estimated total of fewer than 18,000 Tipo B Officer's model revolvers were ever manufactured.

The Tipo B Officer's model revolver should not be confused with the Modello Allegrito, which also has a trigger guard, but has a round 3.5" barrel, and were never manufactured until after the end of WW1.

Modello Allegrito (Lightened Model)

The Modello Allegrito has a 3.5" rounded barrel and a trigger guard. Because of the presence of a trigger guard, the Modello Allegrito is often mistaken by inexperienced collectors for the Tipo B officer's model revolver. 

Importantly, however, the Modello Allegrito revolver has a rounded 3.5" barrel, which is the key diferentiating feature from the Tipo B Officer's Model revolvers. Modello Allegrito revolvers were also hot caustic blued instead of rust blued.

Further, the Modello Allegrito production only began in 1922, long after the ending of WWI. The Modello Allegrito was never used by the Royal Italian Army, and instead was primarily issued to Italian police forces, such as the Italian Custom's Officers. 

Modello Allegrito revolvers are found without year of manufacture, though can be readily identified as they were manufactured by [Bresciana gia Tempini] or Napoleone e Vittorio Castelli.

Production continued until late 1926, for a total production of an estimated 50,000 Modello Allegrito revolvers.

Alternates

A few alternate models exist, such as Bodeo pattern revolvers manufactured for commercial sale. These often have mechanically distinctive features such as different lockwork that differs from the primary models of the Bodeo revolver.

Mechanics
The Bodeo was considered simple and robust. Due to the revolver being produced by a multitude of manufacturers, the quality of the weapon varied greatly, with the early production models made by the Brescia Arsenal and Glisenti Brescia between 1889-1906 showing much greater workmanship and quality than wartime production models.

Frames were made from a wide variety of materials ranging from brass to brazed copper plates. The loading gate was connected to the hammer via the Abadie patent with the barrel screwed into the frame. Ejection was achieved by the rod normally housed in the hollow axis pin. The hammer block was designed to prevent firing unless the trigger was fully cocked.

References

Weapons and ammunition introduced in 1889
Early revolvers
Revolvers of Italy
Military revolvers
World War I Italian infantry weapons
World War II infantry weapons of Germany
World War II infantry weapons of Italy